Glyoxylate reductase/hydroxypyruvate reductase is an enzyme that in humans is encoded by the GRHPR gene.

This gene encodes an enzyme with hydroxypyruvate reductase, glyoxylate reductase, and D-glycerate dehydrogenase enzymatic activities. The enzyme has widespread tissue expression and has a role in metabolism. Type II hyperoxaluria is caused by mutations in this gene. GRHPR mutation analysis needs to pay attention to primer design, because allele dropout can cause false-positive result.

References

External links
  GeneReviews/NCBI/NIH/UW entry on Primary Hyperoxaluria Type 2

Further reading